Swift Boat or swift boat may refer to:

 Patrol Craft Fast, known as "Swift Boats", boats operated by the United States Navy during the Vietnam War
 Swift Boat Veterans for Truth, former name of the political group Swift Vets and POWs for Truth
 Flyboat (also called swift boat), a light and fast passenger boat

See also
 Swiftboating, political jargon for a particular form of character assassination as a smear tactic